The Houston Astros are a Major League Baseball (MLB) franchise based in Houston, Texas. They currently play in the American League West division. The first game of the new baseball season for a team is played on Opening Day, and being named the Opening Day starter is an honor, which is often given to the player who is expected to lead the pitching staff that season, though there are various strategic reasons why a team's best pitcher might not start on Opening Day. 

The Astros began to play in 1962 as the Houston Colt .45s (their name was changed to the Astros in 1965 when the Houston Astrodome opened as their home ball park).  Bobby Shantz started their first Opening Day game on April 10, 1962 against the Chicago Cubs at Houston's Colt Stadium and was credited with the win.  In their first eight seasons, the Colt .45s / Astros used eight different Opening Day starters.  In 1970, that streak ended when Larry Dierker made his second Opening Day start.

Roy Oswalt has made the most Opening Day starts for the Astros, with eight such starts from 2003 through 2010.  Three different pitchers have each made five Opening Day starts for the Astros: J. R. Richard (1976–1980), Mike Scott (1987–1991) and Shane Reynolds (1996–2000).  Dierker made four Opening Day starts for the Astros, and Joe Niekro and Hall of Famer Nolan Ryan made three apiece.  Dierker has the best record in Opening Day starts with four wins and no losses.  Niekro and Don Wilson share the worst record in Opening Day starts with no wins and two losses each.  Niekro also had one no decision.

The Houston Astros have used 27 different Opening Day starting pitchers in their 61 seasons. The 27 starters have a combined Opening Day record of 30 wins, 21 losses and ten no decisions (which has resulted in a record of 33–28).  No decisions are only awarded to the starting pitcher if the game is won or lost after the starting pitcher has left the game. The Astros have played in three home ball parks.  Their first home ball park was Colt Stadium.  Their starting pitchers had one win and one loss in their two Opening Day games at Colt Stadium.  They played 25 Opening Day games in the Astrodome after moving there in 1965, and their starting pitchers had a record of twelve wins, eight losses and five no decisions in those games (going 14–11 overall).  In 2000, they moved to Enron Field (subsequently renamed Astros Field and Minute Maid Park) in Downtown Houston.  Through 2022, they have played fifteen Opening Day games there and have seen Astro pitchers go 8–4 with three no decisions (8–7 overall). This makes the record of the Astros' Opening Day starting pitchers in home games 21 wins, 13 losses and eight no decisions (23–19 overall). Their record in Opening Day away games is nine wins, eight losses and two no decisions (10–9 overall).  The Astros have advanced to the World Series four times. In 2022, they set a modern Major League Baseball record by winning on Opening Day for the tenth straight season.

Key

Pitchers

References 

Opening day starters
Lists of Major League Baseball Opening Day starting pitchers